The Partner (Vietnamese: Người cộng sự; Japanese: Za Pātonā ~ itoshiki hyakunen no tomo e ~) is a 2013 Japanese-Vietnamese historical telefilm based on the true story of the Vietnamese independence fighter Phan Bội Châu and his Japanese friend Asaba Sakitaro. The film aired on September 29, 2013 on Vietnam Television in Vietnam and Tokyo Broadcasting System Television in Japan.

Cast

Meiji era 
Noriyuki Higashiyama as Asaba Sakitaro
Huỳnh Đông as Phan Bội Châu 
Bình Minh as Cường Để   
Emi Takei as Oiwa Akane     
Kazue Fukiishi as Asaba Masa
Hồng Đăng as Trần Đông Phong
Tetsuya Takeda as Inukai Tsuyoshi
Akira Emoto as Ōkuma Shigenobu

21st century 
Noriyuki Higashiyama as Tetsuya Suzuki 
Huỳnh Đông as Nguyễn Thành Nam 
Mana Ashida as Sakura Suzuki
Lan Phương as Lê Hồng Liên   
Yuichi Nakamaru as Noriaki Hatakeyama
Yukiyo Toake as Machi Kinoshita

Production 
The film was produced in 2013 to mark 40 years of diplomatic relations between Japan and Vietnam. Filming took place in both countries from June to July 2013. Vietnamese actors Huỳnh Đông and Lan Phương had to learn Japanese for their roles.

Awards
The Partner won five out of eight awards in the Direct-to-Video Film category at the 2013 Vietnam Film Festival.

External links

 Official site

References 

Phan Bội Châu
Japanese historical drama films
Japanese multilingual films
Vietnamese multilingual films
2013 multilingual films
Vietnamese drama films
2013 biographical drama films
Japanese biographical drama films
Japanese nonlinear narrative films
Vietnamese nonlinear narrative films
2013 films
Films about the Vietnamese independence movement
2010s Japanese films